Events from the year 1183 in Ireland.

Incumbent
Lord: John

Events

 John de Courcy provided for the establishment of a priory at the cathedral of Down with generous endowments to the Benedictines from Chester in England (free from all subjugation to Chester Cathedral).

References